Transform may refer to:

Arts and entertainment
Transform (scratch), a type of scratch used by turntablists
Transform (Alva Noto album), 2001
Transform (Howard Jones album) or the title song, 2019
Transform (Powerman 5000 album) or the title song, 2003
Transform (Rebecca St. James album), 2000
Transform (single album), by Teen Top, or the title song, 2011
"Transform", a song by Daniel Caesar from Freudian, 2017
"Transform", a song by Your Memorial from Redirect, 2012

Mathematics, science, and technology

Mathematics
Tensor transformation law, a defining property of tensors
Tensor product model transformation, numerical method applied to control theory
Transformation (function), concerning functions from sets to themselves
Transform theory, theory of integral transforms
List of transforms, a list of mathematical transforms
Integral transform, a type of mathematical transform

Computer graphics
Transform coding, a type of data compression for digital images
Transform, clipping, and lighting, a term used in computer graphics

Other sciences
Transformation (genetics), the process where a gene or genes are added to an organism's genome
Transform fault, in geology, a fault which runs along the boundary of a tectonic plate

Organizations
Transform Holdco, the parent company of Sears and Kmart
Transform (consulting firm), an American management consulting company
Transform (organization), an organization focusing urban planning issues in San Francisco, United States 
Transform Drug Policy Foundation, a British charity working in the field of drug policy

Other uses
Samsung Transform, an Android smartphone manufactured by Samsung

See also 
Transformation (disambiguation)